Rosemary, That's for Remembrance is a 1914 American silent short drama directed by Francis J. Grandon. The film starred Earle Foxe and Adda Gleason.

External links

American silent short films
1914 drama films
1914 films
Films directed by Francis J. Grandon
1914 short films
Silent American drama films
American black-and-white films
1910s American films
American drama short films